The National Solo class is a racing dinghy designed by Jack Holt in 1956. The Solo is sailed in the United Kingdom, Holland, Portugal and Australia.

Originally designed in wood, competitive boats are now widely available in Fibre Reinforced Plastic (FRP) or composite construction (FRP hull and wood deck) as well as wood.

2016 was the 60th anniversary of the design and the Class Association organised a series of events to celebrate. A draw of all National Solo Class Association members was made in which the prize was Solo 6000.

2017 Class Measurement rule changes allowed corrector weights to be moved from aft end of centreboard cast to below the thwart.

 Double-chined hull
 May be constructed from wood, FRP or composite (GRP hull, wooden decking)
 Available as a kit, part-built or complete. Plans available from the RYA for a completely DIY boat. 
 Keel stepped, stayed mast
 Fully battened sail
 Inward sloping decks for comfortable sitting out
 Most boats have centre mainsheet, but aft sheeting permitted by class rules
 A Very Active Class Association
 One of the most popular racing classes in the UK

Some UK Clubs with large Solo fleets

 Barnt Green Sailing Club, Barnt Green, Worcestershire, B45 8BH.
 Hickling Broad sailing Club, Hickling, Norfolk, NR12 0YJ.
 Bough Beech Sailing Club, near Sevenoaks, Kent
 Broadwater Sailing Club, Denham, Bucks
 Chew Valley Lake Sailing Club, Somerset
 Budworth Sailing Club, Cheshire
 Chipstead Sailing Club, Sevenoaks, Kent
 Elton Sailing Club , Bury, Greater Manchester
 Fishers Green Sailing Club, Waltham Abbey, Essex
 Grafham Water Sailing Club, Cambridgeshire
 Island Barn Reservoir Sailing Club, West Molesey, London/Surrey border
 Kingsmead Sailing Club, Berkshire
 Littleton Sailing Club, Shepperton, Middlesex
 Marconi Sailing Club, Steeple, Essex
 Midland Sailing Club, Birmingham
 Ripon Sailing Club, Farnham,  near Knaresborough, North Yorkshire.
 South Cerney Sailing Club, Gloucestershire
 Carsington Sailing Club , Ashbourne, Derbyshire
 West Kirby Sailing Club, Merseyside
 Hollingworth Lake Sailing Club, Greater Manchester
 Frensham Pond Sailing Club, south west Surrey
 Leigh and Lowton Sailing Club, Greater Manchester
 Papercourt Sailing Club, Ripley, Surrey

References

External links
UK National Solo Class Association
Nederlandse Soloklasse Organisatie

Dinghies
Boats designed by Jack Holt